The economics of religion concerns both the application of the techniques of economics to the study of religion and the relationship between economic and religious behaviours. Contemporary writers on the subject trace it back to Adam Smith (1776). 

Empirical work examines the causal influence of religion in microeconomics to explain individual behaviour and in the macroeconomic determinants of economic growth. Religious economics (or theological economics) is a related subject sometimes overlapping or conflated with the economics of religion.

History 
Adam Smith laid a foundation for economic analysis for religion in The Wealth of Nations (1776), stating that religious organisations are subject to market forces, incentive and competition problems like any other sector of the economy. Max Weber later identified a relationship between religion and economic behaviour, attributing in 1905 the modern advent of capitalism to the Protestant reformation.

Religion and individual behaviour
Research highlights the importance of religious orthodoxy on moral behaviours and versions of the Golden Rule “Do unto others as you would have others do unto you” are common to most major religions. Others argue it promotes cooperation and trust within culturally defined groups or clubs. Studies compare the complementary effects of religious values such as charity, forgiveness, honesty and tolerance and religious social groups where membership instils favouritism or discrimination towards in or outgroup members.

Believing
The believing channel of religion behaviours concerns costly effort concerned with divine reputation. Azzi and Ehrenberg (1975) propose individuals allocate time and money to secular and religious institutions to maximise utility in this life and the afterlife. The colonisation of religious minds by the morally concerned supernatural or “Big Gods” diffused behaviours derived from moral instruction.

Belonging
The belonging approach to religion considers the social notion of between and within religious groups. Iannaconne (1998) assigns religion as a 'club good' from a rational choice perspective where costly rituals exclude free-riders from in-group benefits. Field experiments also evidence religious people are more trusting and cooperative with fellow religious adherents. Many experimental studies suggest group belonging has a greater influence on behaviour than belief orthodoxy. As Darwin (1874) among others argue, the promotion of cooperative in-group behaviours is not unique to religious networks.

Experimental economics of religion

Experimental methods can be applied to isolate the effect of religion on behaviour patterns and to distinguish between believing versus belonging channels. Experimental methods are useful in the economics of religion to standardise measurement and identify causal effect. Methods include looking at religion in various games – Prisoner's dilemma, public goods game, ultimatum game, dictator game and parametric choice. Generally, as Hoffman's (2011) survey shows, few statistically significant results have been identified which commentators attribute to opposing positive versus negative effects between and within individuals.

Religion and economic growth

Studies suggest there is a channel from religious behaviours to macroeconomic outcomes of economic growth, crime rates and institutional development. Scholars hypothesise religion impacts economic outcomes through religious doctrines promoting thrift, work ethic, honesty and trust.

Historical aspects 
Religion can have long-lasting effects on a society and its economy. For instance, municipalities of Spain with a history of a stronger inquisitorial presence show lower economic performance and educational attainment today. Similarly, protestantism in Germany has long affected education and thus economic performance. In 1816, school attendance was about 50% in catholic regions while it was about 66% in protestant regions.

Criticisms
The correlation between religion and economic outcomes can be interpreted in two ways: (1) a feature intrinsic to religion which affects growth or (2) a feature correlated to religion but not religion itself which affects growth. Existing cross-country literature is criticised for inability to distinguish between the two explanations, a problem termed endogeneity bias. Controlling for country fixed effects mitigates bias but more recent studies utilise field and natural experiments to identify the causal effect of religion.

See also
 Buddhist economics
 Sociology of religion
 Religious economy
 Religiosity and intelligence
 Wealth and religion

References

External links
 Economics of Religion Gateway: "What is the economic study of religion?" from the Association for the Study of Religion, Economics, and Culture.
 European Network on the Economics of Religion
 "Economists Are Getting Religion," Business Week
 "The economics of religion"